Wilhelm Wessel was a German book publisher of the 17th century. Based in the town of Kassel, he published the Hessian Arms Book as well as the controversial Fama Fraternitatis.

References

German book publishers (people)